A low-residency program (or limited residency program) is a form of education, normally at the university level, which involves some amount of distance education and brief on-campus or specific-site residencies—residencies may be one weekend or several weeks. These programs are most frequently offered by colleges and universities that also teach standard full-time courses on campus. There are numerous master's degree programs in a wide range of content areas; one of the most popular limited residency degree programs is the Master of Fine Arts in creative writing.  The first such program was developed by Evalyn Bates and launched in 1963 at Goddard College in Plainfield, Vermont.

There are low-residency MFA programs in creative writing, visual arts, photography, and painting. Other graduate programs that can earn a student a degree include Master of Arts, Master of Science, Master of Business Administration, and Master of Accounting. A few schools offer limited residency undergraduate options: Goddard College, Prescott College, Lesley University, New Hampshire Institute of Art, and Union Institute & University.

Structure 
Programs vary, but an intensive, low-residency model requires students to come to campus every six months for 1-2 weeks, during which time students engage in a variety of activities and lectures during the day, and create detailed study plans. During the non-residency semester periods, students study independently, sending in "packets" to their faculty mentors every month or so. The content of the packets varies with each individual, but focuses on research, writing, and reflection related to each student's individualized study plan. A few schools, such as Western State Colorado University, actually conduct live online classes via Skype each week during the non-residency periods as well as having instructors reading students' work and provide written feedback weekly.

List of colleges with low-residency programs

United States
 Alma College, MFA in creative writing
 Antioch University Los Angeles, MFA in creative writing
 Antioch University, Ph.D. in leadership and change
 Arcadia University, MFA in creative writing
 Ashland University
MFA poetry
MFA creative nonfiction
MFA fiction
MFA interdisciplinary
 Augsburg University, MFA in creative writing
 Bastyr University MS in Midwifery
 Belmont University, MFA in Visual Arts
 Bennington College
MFA in writing
MA in teaching a second language (MATSL)
 Boston Architectural College
 Master of Architecture, DIstance
 Master of Architecture, Sustainable Design
 Master of Design Studies, Historic Preservation
 Master of Design Studies, Design for Human Health
 Burlington College, independent degree program
 California College of the Arts, MFA in comics
 Carlow University, MFA in creative writing
 Chatham University,  MFA creative writing
 College of Saint Elizabeth (Morristown, New Jersey), M.A. in theology
 Converse College (Spartanburg, South Carolina) MFA in creative writing
 Cornell College (Mount Vernon, Iowa), MFA in creative writing
 Drew University (Madison, New Jersey), MFA in poetry
 Eastern Kentucky University (Richmond, Kentucky) MFA in creative writing
Fairleigh Dickinson University, MFA in creative writing
 Fairfield University, MFA in creative writing
 Goddard College
MFA creative writing
MFA interdisciplinary arts
BFA creative writing
MA & BA individualized studies 
MA & BA education 
MA & BA psychology & counseling
BA & MA health arts & sciences
BA in sustainability 
 Goucher College
MFA in Creative Nonfiction
 Master of Arts in Cultural Sustainability (MACS)
Master of Arts in Historic Preservation
 Master of Arts in Arts Administration
 Hamline University, MFA in writing for children and young adults
 Institute of American Indian Arts
 MFA in studio arts
 Jacksonville University
 MFA in choreography
 MFA in visual arts 
 Lesley University
Master of Science ecological teaching and learning
Master of Arts expressive therapies 
 MFA in creative writing
 MFA in Visual Arts
 Maine College of Art, MFA in studio arts
 Marylhurst University (Portland, Oregon), B.A. in English literature & new media
 Marywood University, MFA in graphic design or illustration
 Massachusetts College of Art and Design, MFA in studio arts
 Mills College, MFA in Translation
 Miami University, 
MFA in fiction
MFA in creative nonfiction
MFA in poetry
 Montclair State University, MFA in dance
 Murray State University, MFA in creative writing
 Naropa University, MFA in creative writing
 New England College
MFA program in poetry
Ms in Sport & Recreation Management
 New Hampshire Institute of Art
 MFA in photography
 MFA in visual arts
 MFA in creative writing
 MFA in writing for stage and screen
 Newport MFA (Newport, Rhode Island), MFA in creative writing
 Northwest Institute of Literary Arts, program now terminated
 Oklahoma City University, Red Earth MFA in creative writing
Oregon State University Cascades, MFA in creative writing
 Pacific Lutheran University, Rainier Writing Workshop
 Pacific Northwest College of Art, MFA in visual studies
 Pacific University, MFA in creative writing
Pennsylvania Academy of the Fine Arts
 Pine Manor College, Solstice Low-Residency MFA Program
 MFA in fiction writing
 MFA in creative nonfiction
 MFA in poetry
 MFA in writing for children & young adults
 MFA in comics & graphic narratives
 Applied Track in pedagogy
 Prescott College
 Ph.D. in sustainability education
 Master of Arts in humanities
 Master of Arts in environmental studies
 Master of Arts in adventure education
 Master of Arts in counseling psychology
 Master of Arts in education
 Bachelor of Arts in education
 Bachelor of Arts in human development
 Bachelor of Arts in arts and culture
 Bachelor of Arts in sustainability and environmental studies
 Queens University of Charlotte
 Reinhardt University, MFA in creative writing
  School of the Art Institute of Chicago
 MFA in studio
 MFA in writing
 Seattle Pacific University, MFA in creative writing
 Seton Hill University, MFA in writing of popular fiction
 Sierra Nevada University 
 MFA in creative writing
 MFA in interdisciplinary arts
 Skidmore College, Master of Arts in liberal studies (MALS)
 Sofia University (formerly the Institute of Transpersonal Psychology)
MA in spiritual guidance
MA in women's spirituality
MA in counseling psychology
 Southern New Hampshire University, Low-Residency MFA in fiction and nonfiction
 Spalding University, MFA in creative writing
 SIT Graduate Institute, Master's in international education
 St. Edwards University in Austin, Texas
 The Bill Munday School of Business
 Master of Business Administration
 Master of Science in leadership and change
 Stephens College
 MFA TV and screenwriting
 Transart Institute
MFA in creative practice (studio)
PhD in studio art (practice-based PhD)
 University of Alaska Anchorage, MFA in creative writing
 University of California, Riverside: Palm Desert Graduate Center, MFA in creative writing 
 University of Hartford
MFA photography
MFA illustration
MFA interdisciplinary
 University of Illinois: MS in library and information science
 University of Nebraska, MFA in creative writing
 University of New Orleans, creative writing
 University of Pennsylvania, MA in applied positive psychology
 University of Southern Maine, Stonecoast MFA Program in creative writing
 University of Tampa, MFA in creative writing
 University of Texas-El Paso, MFA in creative writing
 Vermont College of Fine Arts
MFA in writing
MFA in writing for children and young adults
MFA in visual arts
MFA in graphic design
MFA in music composition
 Western New England University, MFA in creative writing
 Warren Wilson College MFA Program for Writers, MFA in creative writing
 West Virginia Wesleyan College, MFA in creative writing
 Western Connecticut State University, MFA in creative and professional writing
 Western State Colorado University
MFA in genre fiction
MFA in poetry
MFA in screen and television writing
MFA in publishing
 Wilkes University, MFA in creative writing

Canada
 Emily Carr University of Art and Design, MFA 
 University of British Columbia, MFA creative writing

Europe
 ArtEZ University of Arts (Arnhem, Netherlands) MA Performance Practices (English speaking Master's Degree, including Choreography, Theatre Practices, Performance Art, Digital Performance, and Dedisciplined Body in Performance) 
 Bath Spa University (Bath, England) PhD in creative writing 
 European Graduate School (Saas-Fee, Switzerland, and Valletta, Malta), MA and PhD
 European Humanities University (Lithuania)
 Free University of Berlin (Berlin, Germany) MA in Visual and Media Anthropology 
 Kingston University, London (Kingston upon Thames, England), MFA/MA Low Residency in creative writing
 University of Oxford (Oxford, England) MSt in creative writing

Asia

 City University of Hong Kong MFA Creative Writing

References

Alternative education
Learning
Distance education